The Fault in Our Stars (Music from the Motion Picture) is the soundtrack for the American romantic comedy-drama film The Fault in Our Stars. The full track list was released on April 13, 2014, and arranged by Nate Walcott and Mike Mogis of Bright Eyes. It includes a few high-profile artists like Kodaline, Birdy and Ed Sheeran, the last of whom wrote the song for the end credits ("All of the Stars"). The soundtrack was released in North America on May 19, 2014, and in the United Kingdom on June 23, 2014.

The lead single from the soundtrack is Charli XCX's contribution "Boom Clap", which debuted on April 11, 2014, and the music video for which premiered June 2. A music video for Sheeran's "All of the Stars" was released May 9, 2014. Music videos were also released for Birdy's "Tee Shirt" on June 6, 2014, and "Not About Angels" on June 12, 2014.

Track listing

Credits and personnel

Credits and personnel for the soundtrack adapted from AllMusic.

Afasi – primary artist
Afasi & Filthy – primary artist
Charlotte Aitchison – composer
Sachiko Asano – art direction, design
Fredrik Berger – composer
Patrik Berger – composer, producer
Birdy – primary artist
Josh Boone – executive producer, liner notes
Marty Bowen – executive producer
Michael H. Brauer – mixing
Jake Bugg – primary artist
Tom Cavanaugh – music business affairs
Charli XCX – primary artist
Jana Coffey – coordination
Keil Corcoran – composer
Tony Corey – marketing
Ruadhri Cushnan – mixing
Danielle Diego – executive in charge of music
Johan Duncanson – composer
Richard Evans – mixing, producer
Filthy – primary artist
James Flannigan – composer
Pete Ganbarg – A&R
Steve Garrigan – composer
Chris Gehringer – mastering
Ellen Ginsburg – music clearance
Shawn Glassford – composer
Wyck Godfrey – executive producer
Anthony Gonzalez – composer
Yann Gonzalez – composer
Stefan Gräslund – composer, producer
Grouplove – composer, primary artist
John Hill – producer
Joshua Hodges – composer
Patrick Houlihan – music supervisor
Indians – primary artist
Søren Løkke Juul – composer, producer
Jake Kennedy – composer
Season Kent – music supervisor, producer
Joseph Khoury – coordination
Kodaline – primary artist
Ray LaMontagne – primary artist
Ray LaMontagne – composer
Lykke Li – composer, primary artist, producer
Magnus Lindehäll – composer
M83 – primary artist
Lasse Marten – mixing
Vincent May – composer
Johnny McDaid – composer, engineer, producer
Justin Meldal-Johnsen – composer
Patrick Morris – composer
Herbert Munkhammar – composer
Tom Odell – composer, primary artist
Rob Orton – mixing
Mark Prendergast – composer
Matthew Prime – composer
Areli Quirarte – management
Ryan Rabin – mixing, producer
The Radio Dept. – primary artist
John Rausch – engineer, mixing
Sam Riback – A&R
Craig Rosen – A&R
Ed Sheeran – composer, primary artist
STRFKR – primary artist
Carolyn Tracey – package production
Jasmine Van Den Bogaerde – composer, producer
Kevin Weaver – A&R, producer
Dan Wilson – composer, producer
Jaymes Young – primary artist
Björn Yttling – composer, producer
Cindy Zaplachinski – legal advisor, music business affairs

Charts

Weekly charts

Year-end charts

Certifications

Original score 

The Fault in Our Stars (Score from the Motion Picture) is the soundtrack, which had 31 instrumental pieces recorded and produced by Mike Mogis and Nate Walcott, and the film score was recorded during 2013–14. The score was released by Atlantic Records on June 9, 2014.

References

Drama film soundtracks
2014 soundtrack albums
The Fault in Our Stars (film)
Atlantic Records soundtracks